Mostakbal Chabab Baladiat Oued Sly, known as MCB Oued Sly or simply MCBOS for short, is an Algerian football club located in Oued Sly, Algeria.The club was founded in 1931 and its colours are red and black. Their home stadium ,Mohamed Boumezrag Stadium, has a capacity of 18,000 spectators. The club is currently playing in the Algerian Ligue 2.

History
On August 5, 2020, MCB Oued Sly promoted to the Algerian Ligue 2.

References

Football clubs in Algeria
Sports clubs in Algeria
1931 establishments in Algeria